Yegor Sergeyevich Sysuyev (born 1 April 1997) is a Russian football player.

Club career
He made his debut in the Russian Professional Football League for FC Oryol on 20 July 2016 in a game against FC Kaluga.

References

External links
 Profile by Russian Professional Football League
 
 

1997 births
Living people
Russian footballers
Association football defenders
Russian expatriate footballers
Expatriate footballers in Armenia
Expatriate footballers in Belarus
Expatriate footballers in Kyrgyzstan
FC Mordovia Saransk players
FC Oryol players
FC Granit Mikashevichi players